Spinal traction may refer to:
Traction (orthopedics)
Spinal decompression
Spinal precautions
Traction in spinal cord injury